The 82nd New York State Legislature, consisting of the New York State Senate and the New York State Assembly, met from January 4 to April 19, 1859, during the first year of Edwin D. Morgan's governorship, in Albany.

Background
Under the provisions of the New York Constitution of 1846, 32 Senators and 128 assemblymen were elected in single-seat districts; senators for a two-year term, assemblymen for a one-year term. The senatorial districts were made up of entire counties, except New York County (four districts) and Kings County (two districts). The Assembly districts were made up of entire towns, or city wards, forming a contiguous area, all within the same county.

At this time there were two major political parties: the Democratic Party and the Republican Party. The Know Nothing movement ran in the election as the "American Party."

Elections
The New York state election, 1858 was held on November 2. Republicans Edwin D. Morgan and Robert Campbell were elected Governor and Lieutenant Governor. The other two statewide elective offices were also carried by the Republicans. The approximate party strength at this election, as expressed by the vote for Governor was: Republican 248,000; Democratic 230,000; and American 61,000.

Sessions
The Legislature met for the regular session at the Old State Capitol in Albany on January 4, 1859; and adjourned on April 19.

DeWitt C. Littlejohn (R) was again elected Speaker with 90 votes against 28 for John W. Chanler (D) and 6 for Chauncey Boughton (A).

On January 18, William A. Wheeler (R) was elected president pro tempore of the State Senate.

State Senate

Districts

 1st District: Queens, Richmond and Suffolk counties
 2nd District: 1st, 2nd, 3rd, 4th, 5th, 7th, 11th, 13th and 19th wards of the City of Brooklyn
 3rd District: 6th, 8th, 9th, 10th, 12th, 14th, 15th, 16th, 17th and 18th wards of the City of Brookland; and all towns in Kings County
 4th District: 1st, 2nd, 3rd, 4th, 5th, 6th, 7th, 8th and 14th wards of New York City
 5th District: 10th, 11th, 13th and 17th wards of New York City
 6th District: 9th, 15th, 16th and 18th wards of New York City
 7th District: 12th, 19th, 20th, 21st and 22nd wards of New York City
 8th District: Putnam, Rockland and Westchester counties
 9th District: Orange and Sullivan counties
 10th District: Greene and Ulster counties
 11th District: Columbia and Dutchess counties
 12th District: Rensselaer and Washington counties
 13th District: Albany County 
 14th District: Delaware, Schenectady  and Schoharie counties
 15th District: Fulton, Hamilton, Montgomery and Saratoga counties
 16th District: Clinton, Essex and Warren counties
 17th District: Franklin and St. Lawrence counties
 18th District: Jefferson and Lewis counties
 19th District: Oneida County
 20th District: Herkimer and Otsego counties
 21st District: Oswego County
 22nd District: Onondaga County
 23rd District: Chenango, Cortland and Madison counties
 24th District: Broome, Tompkins and Tioga counties
 25th District: Cayuga and Wayne counties
 26th District: Ontario, Seneca and Yates counties
 27th District: Chemung, Schuyler and Steuben counties
 28th District: Monroe County
 29th District: Genesee, Niagara and Orleans counties
 30th District: Allegany, Livingston and Wyoming counties
 31st District: Erie County
 32nd District: Cattaraugus and Chautauqua counties

Note: There are now 62 counties in the State of New York. The counties which are not mentioned in this list had not yet been established, or sufficiently organized, the area being included in one or more of the abovementioned counties.

Members
The asterisk (*) denotes members of the previous Legislature who continued in office as members of this Legislature.

Employees
 Clerk: Samuel P. Allen
 Deputy Clerk: Henry J. Sickles
 Sergeant-at-Arms: Henry W. Dwight
 Assistant Sergeant-at-Arms: Simeon Dillingham
 Doorkeeper: Richard U. Owens
 First Assistant Doorkeeper: Henry W. Shipman
 Second Assistant Doorkeeper: Samuel Ten Eyck
 Third Assistant Doorkeeper: James P. Clark
 Journal Clerk: James Terwilliger
 Engrossing Clerks: A. N. Cole, Charles G. Fairman

State Assembly

Assemblymen
The asterisk (*) denotes members of the previous Legislature who continued as members of this Legislature.

Party affiliations follow the vote for Speaker.

Employees
 Clerk:  William Richardson
 Sergeant-at-Arms: Daniel M. Prescott
 Doorkeeper: George C. Dennis
 First Assistant Doorkeeper: 
 Second Assistant Doorkeeper:

Notes

Sources
 The New York Civil List compiled by Franklin Benjamin Hough, Stephen C. Hutchins and Edgar Albert Werner (1867; see pg. 439 for Senate districts; pg. 442 for senators; pg. 450–462 for Assembly districts; and pg. 487ff for assemblymen)
 Journal of the Senate (82nd Session) (1859)
 Journal of the Assembly (82nd Session) (1859)
 Biographical Sketches of the State Officers and Members of the Legislature of the State of New York in 1859 by William D. Murphy

082
1859 in New York (state)
1859 U.S. legislative sessions